
Year 448 BC was a year of the pre-Julian Roman calendar. At the time, it was known as the Year of the Consulship of Coritinesanus and Caeliomontanus (or, less frequently, year 306 Ab urbe condita). The denomination 448 BC for this year has been used since the early medieval period, when the Anno Domini calendar era became the prevalent method in Europe for naming years.

Events 
 By place 
 Greece 
 Pericles leads the Athenian army against Delphi to restore the sanctuary of the oracle of Delphi to Phocis.
 The Athenians begin constructing the middle component of the Long Walls from their main city to its port of Piraeus.

 Rome 
 Following the co-optation of two patricians to the office of Tribune of the Plebs, the tribune Lucius Trebonius Asper introduces the Lex Trebonia, a law forbidding tribunes from co-opting their colleagues in the future.

Births 
Bardyllis, king of Dardania (d. 358 BC)

Deaths

References